Reflection is a Burmese language film directed by Lu Min. The film was produced by Thudra Productions, a corporation owned by Eaindra Kyaw Zin. The movie starred Htun Eaindra Bo, Eaindra Kyaw Zin, Wutt Hmone Shwe Yi, and Pactria.

Cast
Htun Eaindra Bo - May Nat Khat - A Myanmarian millionaire and Lesbian.
Eaindra Kyaw Zin - May Nine
Wutt Hmone Shwe Yi - Co Cole
Patricia - A Yake

References

External links

2018 films
2010s Burmese-language films
Burmese action films
Films shot in Myanmar